"I'll give you my gun when you pry (or take) it from my cold, dead hands" is a slogan popularized by the National Rifle Association (NRA) on a series of bumper stickers. It is a variation of a slogan mentioned in a 1976 report from the Senate Judiciary Committee Subcommittee to Investigate Juvenile Delinquency: "I Will Give Up My Gun When They Peel My Cold Dead Fingers From Around It." The original version did not originate with the NRA, but with another gun rights group, the Citizens Committee for the Right to Keep and Bear Arms, based in Bellevue, Washington. It, along with "If guns are outlawed, only outlaws will have guns", is a slogan that is often used by gun owners and their supporters in criticisms of proposals of gun control in the United States.

Use by Charlton Heston
The phrase gained newfound popularity following the 129th NRA convention, in Charlotte, North Carolina on May 20, 2000, when actor and then-president of the NRA, Charlton Heston, ended a speech by concluding:

Heston then paused to pick up a replica of a flintlock long rifle and continued:

Use in American politics
The phrase has been used by numerous pro-gun rights groups including The National Rifle Association, National Association for Gun Rights. The term also lends itself to the Second Amendment for-profit corporation Cold Dead Hands.

Media appearances
In the 1984 film Red Dawn, Soviet paratroopers invade the middle United States. A bumper sticker with the statement on it is shown, and then the camera pans to an M1911A1 pistol clutched in its dead owner's hand. One of the paratroopers literally takes the gun from his dead hands, shoves it in his own belt, and then leaves.

In the 1997 film Men in Black, a farmer named Edgar threatens a recently landed evil alien with a shotgun. Told to drop the weapon, Edgar says, "You can have my gun when you pry it from my cold, dead fingers." The alien responds, "Your proposal is acceptable", kills Edgar, and begins using his skin as a disguise.

The phrase is used to introduce Heston (and thence his NRA experience) to viewers of Michael Moore's 2002 documentary film Bowling for Columbine.

In 2005, the phrase was parodied by The Onion in their "300th Anniversary" issue dated June 22, 2056. A small item on the page claimed: "Grave robbers pry valuable rifle from Charlton Heston's cold, dead hands". Later in 2008, shortly after Charlton Heston's death, The Onion again parodied the phrase in a photo caption.

The 2012 update Mann vs Machine for the video game Team Fortress 2 contains a parody of the phrase as one of the Soldier character responses: "You can have this when you pry it from my cold, dead hands. And even then, good luck! Because I will have glued it to my cold, dead hands!"

In 2013, Jim Carrey with The Eels created a single and accompanying music video "Cold Dead Hand", ridiculing gun culture in the United States and specifically Charlton Heston, declaring that he could not enter Heaven as even angels could not pry the gun from his hands.

Anthony Jeselnik, on his 2013 TV show, The Jeselnik Offensive, said, "They can have my gun when they pry it from my curious six-year-old's cold dead hands."

See also
 Molon labe, a similar classical phrase
 "Come and take it", a slogan used in 1835 during the Texas Revolution
 They shall not pass
 Not one step back

References

Quotations
American political catchphrases
1976 neologisms
Gun politics in the United States